Yeniarx (also, Yeniarkh) is a village and municipality in the Goychay Rayon of Azerbaijan.  It has a population of 1,340. The municipality consists of the villages of Yeniarx and Hacıağabəyli.

References 

Populated places in Goychay District